Still Life, originally released in Argentina and Spain under the title Naturaleza muerta, is a Spanish language thriller film and the feature film directorial debut of Gabriel Grieco. The movie had its world premiere on 7 October 2014 at the Sitges Film Festival and stars Luz Cipriota as a journalist whose devotion to her craft has placed her life in danger. In 2013 an unfinished version of the film was one of two films that were given a Bloody Work in Progress Award by the Ventana Sur film festival, which secured distribution rights for DVD, VOD and pay tv for Mexican territory.

Synopsis
Jazmín (Luz Cipriota) is an intrepid young reporter that decides to investigate the disappearance of the daughter of a wealthy cattle businessman. She soon finds that this disappearance is more than what it seems, as it is related to multiple murders and the resulting story has the potential to give Jazmín a name in the reporting world. As she delves deeper and deeper into the mystery she also brings herself and her cameraman closer to danger, as someone or someones do not want their activities to be uncovered.

Cast
Luz Cipriota as Jazmín Alsina
Amin Yoma as Dan
Nicolás Pauls as Gerardo Basavilbaso
Juan Palomino as Miguel Kraezawer
Nicolás Maiques as Joaquín González
Ezequiel De Almeida as Diego
Mercedes Oviedo as Julia Cotonese
Néstor Sánchez como José Aymar
Verónica Pelaccini as Juliana
Sabrina Carballo as News reporter
Berta Muñiz as José
Patricio Sardelli as Raúl Cotonese
Cristian "Toti" Iglesias as himself
Walter Leiva as himself

Development
Grieco stated that he was inspired to create Still Life after watching an Anima Naturalis television spot that focused on animal rights NGOs. He stated that he then began to view footage of cruelty inflicted on food animals, which he felt was a double standard because while the cruelty existed it did not deter consumer purchasing rates and seemed to Grieco as if the cruelty was deliberately being ignored. Grieco filmed the movie on a limited budget and actress Cipriota stated that this aspect was part of what drew her to the film.

Reception
Bloody Disgusting gave Still Life 3.5 out of 5 skulls, writing that while most of the film- particularly its opening prologue- was extremely powerful, the film's epilogue was "so painfully contrived and farcical that it shirks off the previous 90 minutes and dives headfirst into laughable slasher territory."

References

External links
 

2010s serial killer films
2014 horror thriller films
2014 directorial debut films
2014 horror films
Argentine horror thriller films
Torture in films
2010s Argentine films